Gavin John Ward (born 30 June 1970) is an English former professional footballer and coach, who is currently goalkeeping coach at Championship side Queens Park Rangers.

He played in the position of goalkeeper from 1987 until 2011. He notably played Premier League football for Leicester City as well as playing for Aston Villa, Shrewsbury Town, West Bromwich Albion, Cardiff City, Bradford City, Bolton Wanderers, Burnley, Stoke City, Walsall, Coventry City, Barnsley, Preston North End, Tranmere Rovers, Chester City, Wrexham, Hednesford Town and Gainsborough Trinity.

Playing career
Ward was born in Sutton Coldfield and began his career with Aston Villa before moving on to Shrewsbury Town. He failed to make an appearance for either club and left for West Bromwich Albion where he made his professional debut in a League Cup match against Bradford City. He then moved to Cardiff City where he finally found regular football becoming a regular in the 1991–92 season and helped the "Bluebirds" win the Division Three title in 1992–93.

He made over 60 league and cup appearances for Cardiff in four seasons before moving to Leicester City for a transfer fee of £175,000 in 1993 where he help them to win promotion to the Premier League in 1994. After leaving Leicester he had a short spell at Bradford City before Bolton Wanderers paid £300,000 for his services in 1996, allowing Ward to again taste top-flight action. He spent three seasons at the Reebok Stadium acting as back-up to Keith Branagan. He spent the first half of the 1998–99 season on loan at Burnley before joining Stoke City on a permanent basis in March 1998. He instantly established himself as first choice 'keeper at the Britannia Stadium and he played in all the club's 60 fixtures during a hectic 1999–2000 season which saw Stoke win the Football League Trophy and reach the play-offs as Stoke lost controversially to Gillingham. He was second choice at Stoke in 2000–01 and 2001–02 and joined Walsall in the summer of 2002.

After spells at Walsall, Coventry City, Barnsley and Preston North End he joined Tranmere Rovers in June 2006. Ward made a bright start to the 2006–07, even managing to score a goal, which came from a free kick just outside his box in the 9th minute against Leyton Orient on 2 September 2006. 

He was released by Tranmere in May 2007 and made the short journey to Chester' where he was reserve and coach to John Danby. Ward's only competitive appearance for Chester was as a half-time substitute for the injured Danby against Crewe Alexandra in the Football League Trophy on 4 September 2007, with Chester going on to win a penalty shoot-out after a 1–1 draw. On 8 January 2008, Ward moved to arch-rivals Wrexham on a free transfer. He played in over 50 matches for the club before being released at the end of the 2008–09 season. Ward went on to play for Hednesford Town during the 2008–09 season.

Coaching career
Following the appointment of Brian Little as manager of Gainsborough Trinity, Ward was appointed Assistant Manager, as well as signing on as the club's reserve goalkeeper.

Ward retired from playing at the end of the 2010–11 season. On 18 July 2011, he left his post at Gainsborough to become Goalkeeping Coach at Shrewsbury Town. He was registered as a player after second-choice goalkeeper Joe Anyon picked up an injury in October 2012, with Ward taking his place on the bench.

On 4 July 2013, Ward agreed to be Goalkeeping Coach at Nottingham Forest.

Career statistics
Source:

A.  The "Other" column constitutes appearances and goals in the Anglo-Italian Cup, Football League play-offs and Football League Trophy.

Honours
Cardiff City
 Football League Third Division Champions: 1992–93

 Bolton Wanderers
 Football League First Division champions: 1996–97

 Leicester City
 Football League First Division play-off winners: 1993–94

 Stoke City
 Football League Trophy winners: 1999–2000

References

External links
 

1970 births
Living people
Association football goalkeepers
English footballers
Premier League players
Aston Villa F.C. players
Shrewsbury Town F.C. players
Cardiff City F.C. players
West Bromwich Albion F.C. players
Leicester City F.C. players
Bradford City A.F.C. players
Bolton Wanderers F.C. players
Burnley F.C. players
Stoke City F.C. players
Walsall F.C. players
Coventry City F.C. players
Barnsley F.C. players
Preston North End F.C. players
Tranmere Rovers F.C. players
Chester City F.C. players
Wrexham A.F.C. players
Gainsborough Trinity F.C. players
Shrewsbury Town F.C. non-playing staff
Nottingham Forest F.C. non-playing staff
Burton Albion F.C. non-playing staff
Queens Park Rangers F.C. non-playing staff
English Football League players
Sportspeople from Sutton Coldfield
National League (English football) players
Hednesford Town F.C. players